Hipolitów may refer to the following places:
Hipolitów, Łask County in Łódź Voivodeship (central Poland)
Hipolitów, Poddębice County in Łódź Voivodeship (central Poland)
Hipolitów, Mińsk County in Masovian Voivodeship (east-central Poland)
Hipolitów, Żyrardów County in Masovian Voivodeship (east-central Poland)